Mary Wangari Wamae, commonly known as Mary Wamae, is a lawyer, businesswoman and corporate executive from Kenya. She is the executive director at Equity Group Holdings, a financial services conglomerate based in Kenya, with subsidiaries in the countries of the African Great Lakes area. Mary was appointed to her current position in July 2018.

Early life and education
Wamae was born and raised in a rural setting, in present-day Nyeri County. She, along with one sister and four brothers were raised by a single mother whose main source of income was peasant agriculture.

She holds a Bachelor of Laws degree, obtained from the University of Nairobi. She went on to obtain a Postgraduate Diploma in Law from the Kenya School of Law. She was then admitted to the Kenya Bar.

Her degree of Master of Arts in Gender and Development Studies was obtained from the University of Nairobi. Later, she was awarded a master's degree in Leadership Innovation and Change, by York St John University, in Nottingham, United Kingdom.

Career
Before joining Equity Bank in 2004, Wamae was a Partner in the law firm of Mary Wangari & Company Advocates, which she had founded and led for 13 years.

She joined the financial institution when it was still Equity Building Society, and served as the Head of Legal Services. The following year, her responsibility was expanded to include the role of Company Secretary.

Her responsibilities progressively increased over the years. Before she took up her current assignment, her position was described as Group Director of Strategy, Legal Services and Group Company Secretary. The company split that position and hired two people to replace her.

In her role as executive director for the banking group, she oversees the group's subsidiaries in DR Congo, Rwanda, South Sudan, Tanzania and Uganda.

Family
She is a mother of three daughters.

See also
 Eva Ngigi–Sarwari
 Julia Carvalho
 Iddah Asin

References

External links
Equity Group Holdings Appoints Mary Wangari Wamae as Group Executive Director As of 17 July 2018.

Living people
20th-century Kenyan lawyers
Kenyan women lawyers
Kenyan business executives
21st-century Kenyan businesswomen
21st-century Kenyan businesspeople
Kikuyu people
21st-century Kenyan lawyers
People from Nyeri County
University of Nairobi alumni
Kenya School of Law alumni
Alumni of York St John University
21st-century women lawyers
Year of birth missing (living people)